The second expedition to Palembang  was a punitive expedition by the Dutch against the Palembang Sultanate in 1821. The commander of the expedition, Hendrik Merkus de Kock, succeeded in coming to an agreement with Sultan Mahmud Badaruddin II.

See also
 First expedition to Palembang

Sources
 1900. W.A. Terwogt. Het land van Jan Pieterszoon Coen. Geschiedenis van de Nederlanders in oost-Indië. P. Geerts. Hoorn
 1900. G. Kepper. Wapenfeiten van het Nederlands Indische Leger; 1816-1900. M.M. Cuvee, Den Haag.'
 1876. A.J.A. Gerlach. Nederlandse heldenfeiten in Oost Indë. Drie delen. Gebroeders

Royal Netherlands Army
Dutch conquest of Indonesia